Terry Rennaker (born May 1, 1958) is a former American football linebacker. He played for the Seattle Seahawks in 1980.

References

1958 births
Living people
American football linebackers
Stanford Cardinal football players
Seattle Seahawks players